Arotrophora chionaula is a moth of the family Tortricidae. It is known from Australia.

Taxonomy
Arotrophora chionaula is the original combination. However, it is known to be misplaced in this genus, but has not been assigned to another genus yet.

References

Archipini
Taxa named by Edward Meyrick
Taxa named by Alexey Diakonoff